Ümit Can Batman (born 26 June 1987 in Seyhan) is a Turkish professional footballer who plays for Kozan Belediyespor. He played previously for Boluspor.

References

1987 births
Living people
Turkish footballers
Boluspor footballers
Gaziantep F.K. footballers
People from Seyhan

Association football forwards